SoFlo Superflat describes an art genre started in Miami in the 1990s. It is an urban pop art movement in South Florida that combines super bright colors and ultra flat images. The subject matters are very diverse. It is an outcrop of the Japanese Superflat movement, founded by the artist Takashi Murakami.

Description 

These artists emphasize outlines and flat areas of color. What is important is the feeling of flatness. Many of the artists involved in SoFlo Superflat art believe that the culture in SoFlo is not three-dimensional; therefore, it can be better interpreted in very flat brightly colored two-dimensional images. SoFlo Superflat was born out of the compression of genres which is shown through the pop-inflected work of younger artists. The artists in this genre have very specific styles that can be best described as a consistent pictorial language. Repetition of images and pattern is used create a signature look. For example, Britto's "squiggle lines" and geometric patterns are consistent themes in his work.   Artists whose work is regarded as "SoFlo Superflat" include: Britto, Caron Bowman, Raul Cremata, Ceron, Ed King, and Jose Alvares.

This new generation of artist does not think about what is art or what is illustration or what is graffiti. Faced with a level of economic uncertainty, SoFlo Superflat artists create their own version of popular culture to draw attention to the dominance of the media, entertainment and consumption.

References 
 
 
 A splash of pop, "South Florida Business Journal" 21.49 (2001): 35. General OneFile. Web. 23 June 2011.
 
 Broder-Singer, Rochelle. "Museum of Contemporary Art." Florida Trend June 2011: 25. General OneFile. Web. 23 June 2011.
 Superflat Miami "Three Studios" superflat http://ennuics.org/2011/04/07/three-studios-superflat
 In Miami, Art Without Angst https://www.nytimes.com/2007/02/04/fashion/04britto.html?pagewanted=all 

 GQ exclusive preview: Hello Guppy, Mumbai https://www.gqindia.com/content/gq-exclusive-preview-hello-guppy-mumba

External links
 Examples of Soflo Superflat Style by Caron
 http://www.ceronart.com

Contemporary art movements
1990s in art
Culture of Miami